Kordon Moshokskogo lesnichestva is a rural locality (a kordon) in Moshokskoye Rural Settlement, Sudogodsky District, Vladimir Oblast, Russia. The population was 8 as of 2010.

Geography 
It is located 3 km north from Moshok, 30 km south-east from Sudogda.

References 

Rural localities in Sudogodsky District